Wilcoxia is a genus of robber flies in the family Asilidae. There are about five described species in Wilcoxia.

Species
These five species belong to the genus Wilcoxia:
 Wilcoxia cinerea James, 1941 i c g
 Wilcoxia martinorum Wilcox, 1972 i c g
 Wilcoxia monae Wilcox, 1972 i c g
 Wilcoxia painteri Wilcox, 1972 i c g
 Wilcoxia pollinosa Wilcox, 1972 i c g
Data sources: i = ITIS, c = Catalogue of Life, g = GBIF, b = Bugguide.net

References

Further reading

External links

 
 

Asilidae